Samuel Pratt (October 6, 1807March 24, 1877) was an American farmer, Republican politician, and Wisconsin pioneer.  He was an early settler at Spring Prairie, Wisconsin, and represented his region in the Wisconsin State Assembly and State Senate for nine sessions between 1849 and 1874.

Background 
Pratt was born in Enfield, Massachusetts on October 6, 1817. In his eighth year his parents removed to Geauga County, Ohio ; then in 1829, they moved to White Pigeon, Michigan. "the country at that time being very new, there being no grist- or sawmill nearer than 100 miles distant, and only a horse-back mail once a week between Detroit and Chicago, and no newspaper published within 130 miles". Due to the lack of schools in the frontier regions where his family had lived, he received only a limited education. He took up the occupation of farmer.

He came to Wisconsin in 1837, and settled in Spring Prairie, but did not move his family until February 1845.

Public office 
He was first elected to a one-year term as a member of the Assembly from Walworth County's 1st Assembly district (Troy, East Troy, and Spring Prairie in 1848 as a Free Soiler to succeed Democrat Gaylord Graves; he was succeeded by Whig Alexander O. Babcock. As a Republican he was elected once more in 1854 for a new district (it was during this term of office that he was one of those who harbored fugitive slave Joshua Glover until he could be safely sent to Canada); and again in 1863 for the redrawn 1st Assembly district  (succeeding Democrat  Hollis Latham); he was succeeded in turn by Lucius Allen of the National Union Party.

He was elected to the Senate (as a Republican) from the 12th district in 1869, succeeding fellow Republican Newton Littlejohn), and re-elected from the new 8th District in 1871, receiving 3,956 votes against 2,161 for Democrat John Tuttle. He would be succeeded by Thompson Weeks, another Republican.

Farming and personal life 
Pratt was the chairman of the convention in the Wisconsin State Capitol which on February 21, 1849 resolved on the organization of a Wisconsin State Agricultural Society; and became a charter member thereof.

He was a judge for Devon cattle for the 1861 and 1864 Wisconsin State Fairs.

His son, Orris Pratt, would also become a member of the Wisconsin State Assembly.

Pratt died in Racine, Wisconsin, in March 1877, while visiting his brother, Benjamin.

References 

1817 births
1877 deaths
Farmers from Wisconsin
Republican Party members of the Wisconsin State Assembly
People from Enfield, Massachusetts
People from White Pigeon, Michigan
People from Geauga County, Ohio
People from Spring Prairie, Wisconsin
Wisconsin Free Soilers
19th-century American politicians
Republican Party Wisconsin state senators